Greal y Corau was a 19th-century Welsh language periodical, first published for the Welsh Choral Union, by Thomas Gee, in Denbigh, in 1861. Its editors included journalist Lewis William Lewis (Llew Llwyfo, 1831-1901) and musician Edward Stephen (née Jones) (Tanymarian, 1822-1885). It contained articles about music and musicians, and music festivals. Many popular Welsh musicians and poets of the 19th Century, such as John Owen published regularly in this popular periodical.

References 

Periodicals published in Wales
Welsh-language magazines
Music magazines published in the United Kingdom